Alikadi Magomedovich Saidov (born 2 April 1999) is a Russian football player. He plays for FC Kaluga.

Club career
Saidov made his debut in the Russian Professional Football League for FC Anzhi-2 Makhachkala on 19 November 2017 in a game against FC Armavir.

Saidov made his Russian Premier League debut for FC Anzhi Makhachkala on 26 May 2019 in a game against FC Ural Yekaterinburg, as a starter.

On 13 January 2021, Saidov signed a new two-year contract with Anzhi Makhachkala.

References

External links
 
 

1999 births
Footballers from Makhachkala
Living people
Russian footballers
Association football defenders
FC Anzhi Makhachkala players
Russian Premier League players
Russian Second League players